Upper Ferry may refer to:
 Upper Ferry, Newfoundland and Labrador, a settlement on the island of Newfoundland, Canada
 Upper Ferry (Wicomico River), a ferry across the Wicomico River in Maryland, United States